Mala is the name of two fictional characters who first appeared in the DC Comics' universe as two members of Wonder Woman's fellow Amazons.

Fictional character biography

Golden/Silver age
Mala was one of the most important Amazons in the Golden Age adventures of Wonder Woman.  Mala was with Diana when they discovered Steve Trevor floating in the sea, and they worked together to bring him to shore.  Mala was also the last Amazon standing alongside a masked Diana during the contest to determine who would venture into Man's World as the Amazon champion.

Mala became the head of the Reform Island program for rehabilitating criminals and the criminally insane. She was typically depicted as blonde and wearing a polka dotted dress.

Mala possessed her own plane, the Swan Plane, which was superfast though not as fast as Wonder Woman's invisible plane nor telepathically controlled.  Mala was also one of the few Amazons to venture into Man's World, though by accident, when her plane was hijacked by Mimi Mendez.

Mala was skilled enough in the Amazons' advanced science to be trusted by Wonder Woman to work alongside Paula to perfect a device Wonder Woman created to install telepathic controls in the invisible plane.

Mala was largely forgotten in the Silver Age, although she reappeared in several dream sequences exploring what-if scenarios. In one, Diana was forced to assume the throne of Paradise Island immediately prior to the Contest, and Mala won to become Wonder Woman.

Modern age
Due to the 1985 Crisis on Infinite Earths storyline, the previously established history of almost all DC Comics characters ceased to exist and was restarted. In Mala's case, she was re-introduced in 1992 as part of an illusion spell the White Magician cast on Wonder Woman. In the illusion Diana imagined herself on Themyscira where Mala and several other Amazons were debasing themselves before male visitors to the island. The real Mala was officially introduced later as a close friend of Diana's. It was revealed that Mala participated in the original Contest to become Wonder Woman (losing to Diana) as well as in the second Contest (which was lost to Artemis).

Mala of Bana-Mighdall
Another Amazon named Mala was introduced as a member of the Bana-Mighdall tribe. Though Amazon born, her tribe was not blessed with immortality. Because of this she was born sometime in the early to mid-twentieth century and lived the general life-span of a common mortal. Within her tribe she is a historian and is sometimes referred to as "The Keeper" as she is also responsible for watching over a bust statue of her tribe's first queen, Antiope. Mala was already an old woman when the witch Circe granted her tribe immortality. Unfortunately Mala's eyesight was greatly diminished after a battle with a demon who spit fire into her face. It was Mala who informed Wonder Woman that she looks identical to the long dead Antiope, Wonder Woman's aunt. As her tribe's historian Mala was shown standing with her people as they requested permission from Queen Hippolyta to participate in the Contest to choose a new Wonder Woman. At Diana's request she allowed the bust statue to be temporarily moved from the Bana-Mighdallian tabernacle to the Themyscirian royal throne room. Whether she was aware that the bust was moved yet again to a wooded clearing on Themyscira is unknown but likely. Mala's present status, as well as that of the bust, is unknown.

DC Rebirth
After the events of DC Rebirth, Mala was not initially seen among the Amazons on Themyscira. However, Diana later mentioned Mala to the former criminal Mayfly, telling her stories of when they would play games on Themyscira.

Other versions

Wonder Woman: Earth One
Mala appears in Wonder Woman: Earth One in a similar manner to her original counterpart, though this time presented as Princess Diana's lover and the Wonder Woman before her.

Injustice: Gods Among Us
Mala appears in the comic series based on the Injustice 2 video game.

Abilities

Mala of Themyscira
Mala has 3,000 years of combat experience providing her expertise in both hand-to-hand combat as well as with hand held weapons. As a Themyscirian Amazon she also possesses immortality that allows her to live indefinitely in a youthful form, but does leave her open to potential injury and death depending on her actions. Mala, as a Themyscirian, also possesses enhanced strength and intelligence. As shown by fellow members of her tribe, she has the capability to break apart steel and concrete with her bare hands, jump over 12 feet from a standing position, has a high durability factor, enhanced healing, and the ability to absorb and process a vast amount of knowledge in a short period of time.

Mala, like all Themyscirian Amazons, possesses the ability to relieve her body of physical injury and toxins by becoming one with the Earth's soil and then reforming her body whole again. During writer John Byrne's time on the comic it was stated that this is a very sacred ritual to the Themyscirians, only to be used in the most dire of circumstances.

Mala of Bana-Mighdall
As with other members of her tribe, Mala has average to above average human level strength, stamina and reflexes. As she was able to survive battling the likes of demons, Mala's durability level is higher than average for someone her age. Despite being an old woman, Mala has ageless immortality that allows her to remain the same age for all time, but leaves her open to possibly dying as it does not provide invulnerability. As a Bana, Mala would be trained in hand-to-hand battle as well as the use and manufacturing of weapons.

In other media

Television
 In 1976 the television series Wonder Woman aired the two-part episode The Feminum Mystique. In the episode an Amazon very similar to Mala was introduced named Magda. She is played by actress Pamela Susan Shoop.

Film
 In the animated film Justice League: New Frontier, Diana debates and spars with a blonde rival Amazon before the Centre appears and devastates Paradise Island. Given the equal ability of both combatants (she is able to wound Diana with her sword), and their readiness to put their dispute aside when threatened, this is most probably Mala, although she is not mentioned by name, and is voiced by Vanessa Marshall (credited as Amazon Woman).

Video games
 Mala appears in the DC Universe Online video game. In the game, she and fellow Amazon Pythia direct game players to various quests.

Novels
 Mala was written to be a finalist in the Contest to be Wonder Woman in the novel "Wonder Woman" by S. D. Perry and Britta Dennison in January 2009, published by Pocket Star Publishing. The book is based on the animated film Wonder Woman, released in March 2009. Despite being named in the book as Diana's final competitor, Mala was only shown and not specifically named in the film it was based on.

See also 
 List of Wonder Woman supporting characters
 The Contest (DC Comics)

Footnotes

Articles about multiple fictional characters
Comics characters introduced in 1941
Characters created by William Moulton Marston
Wonder Woman characters
DC Comics Amazons
DC Comics characters who can move at superhuman speeds
DC Comics characters with accelerated healing
DC Comics characters with superhuman strength
DC Comics female superheroes
Characters created by H. G. Peter
DC Comics LGBT superheroes 
Fictional characters with immortality
Fictional lesbians